Sir John Franklin  (16 April 1786 – 11 June 1847) was a British Royal Navy officer and Arctic explorer. After serving in wars against Napoleonic France and the United States, he led two expeditions into the Canadian Arctic and through the islands of the Arctic Archipelago, in 1819 and 1825, and served as Lieutenant-Governor of Van Diemen's Land from 1839 to 1843. During his third and final expedition, an attempt to traverse the Northwest Passage in 1845, Franklin's ships became icebound off King William Island in what is now Nunavut, where he died in June 1847. The icebound ships were abandoned ten months later and the entire crew died, from causes such as starvation, hypothermia, and scurvy.

Biography

Early life 
His father was a merchant descended from a line of country gentlemen while his mother was the daughter of a farmer. One of his brothers later entered the legal profession and eventually became a judge in Madras; another joined the East India Company; while a sister, Sarah, was the mother of Emily Tennyson, wife of Alfred, Lord Tennyson. John Franklin must have been affected by an obvious desire to better his social and economic position, given that his elder brothers struggled, sometimes successfully and sometimes not, to establish themselves in a wide variety of careers.

Educated at King Edward VI Grammar School in Louth, he soon became interested in a career at sea. His father, who intended for Franklin to enter the church or become a businessman, was initially opposed but was reluctantly convinced to allow him to go on a trial voyage on a merchant ship when he was aged 12.

Commanded by Captain Lawford, the Polyphemus carried 64 guns and, at the time of Franklin's appointment, was still at sea. He did not join the vessel until the autumn of 1800. Initially serving as a first class volunteer, Franklin soon saw action in the Battle of Copenhagen in which the Polyphemus participated as part of Horatio Nelson's squadron. An expedition to the coast of Australia aboard , commanded by Captain Matthew Flinders, followed, with Franklin now a midshipman. He was present at the Battle of Trafalgar in 1805 aboard . During the War of 1812 against the United States, Franklin, now a lieutenant, served aboard  and was wounded during the Battle of Lake Borgne in December 1814, just prior to the decisive U.S. victory at the Battle of New Orleans one month later.

Franklin commanded  in 1818 on a journey from London to Spitzbergen, now Svalbard. The overall expedition was commanded by Captain David Buchan on HMS Dorothea.

1819: Coppermine expedition 

In 1819, Franklin was chosen to lead the Coppermine expedition overland from Hudson Bay to chart the north coast of Canada eastwards from the mouth of the Coppermine River.

Between 1819 and 1822, he lost 11 of the 20 men in his party. Most died of starvation or exhaustion, but there were also at least one murder and suggestions of cannibalism. The survivors were forced to eat lichen and even attempted to eat their own leather boots. This gained Franklin the nickname of "the man who ate his boots".

1823: Marriage and third Arctic expedition 

In 1823, after returning to England, Franklin married the poet Eleanor Anne Porden. Their daughter, Eleanor Isabella, was born the following year. His wife died of tuberculosis in 1825. Eleanor Isabella married Reverend John Philip Gell in 1849. She died in 1860.

In 1825, he left for his second Canadian and third Arctic expedition, the Mackenzie River expedition. The goal this time was the mouth of the Mackenzie River from which he would follow the coast westward and possibly meet Frederick William Beechey who would try to sail northeast from the Bering Strait. With him was John Richardson who would follow the coast east from the Mackenzie to the mouth of the Coppermine River.

At the same time, William Edward Parry would try to sail west from the Atlantic. At this time, the only known points on the north coast were a hundred or so miles east from the Bering Strait, the mouth of the Mackenzie, Franklin's stretch east of the Coppermine, and a bit of the Gulf of Boothia which had been seen briefly from the land.) Supplies were better organized this time, in part because they were managed by Peter Warren Dease of the Hudson's Bay Company (HBC).

He erected a flagpole with buried letters for Parry. He returned to winter at Fort Franklin (modern-day Délı̨nę) on Great Bear Lake. The following summer he went downriver and found the ocean frozen.

He reached Liverpool on the first of September 1827. Richardson's eastward journey was more successful. Franklin's diary from this expedition describes his men playing hockey on the ice of the Great Bear Lake; Délı̨nę, built on the site of Fort Franklin, thus considers itself to be one of the birthplaces of the sport.

On , he married Jane Griffin, a friend of his first wife and a seasoned traveler who proved indomitable in the course of their life together. On , he was knighted by George IV and the same year awarded the first Gold Medal of the Société de Géographie of France. On , he was made Knight Commander of the Royal Guelphic Order and a Knight of the Greek Order of the Redeemer.

1837: Lieutenant-Governor of Van Diemen's Land 
Franklin was appointed Lieutenant Governor of Van Diemen's Land in 1837, but was removed from office in 1843. He is remembered by a significant landmark in the centre of Hobart—a statue of him dominates the park known as Franklin Square, which was the site of the original Government House. On the plinth below the statue appears Tennyson's epitaph:

His wife worked to set up a university, which was eventually established in 1890, and a museum, credited to the Royal Society of Tasmania in 1843 under the leadership of her husband. Lady Franklin may have worked to have the Lieutenant-Governor's private botanical gardens, established in 1818, managed as a public resource. Lady Franklin also established a glyptotheque and surrounding lands to support it near Hobart. Sir John and Lady Jane Franklin adopted the daughter of the chief of an indigenous Australian tribe. She was renamed Mathinna and was raised with their own daughter Eleanor, but she was abandoned in Tasmania when the Franklins returned to England in 1843.

The village of Franklin, on the Huon River, is named in his honour, as is the Franklin River on the West Coast of Tasmania, one of the better known Tasmanian rivers due to the Franklin Dam controversy.

Shortly after leaving his post as Lieutenant Governor of Van Diemen's Land, Franklin revisited a cairn on Arthurs Seat, a small mountain just inside Port Phillip Bay in Victoria, Australia, that he had visited as a midshipman with Captain Matthew Flinders in April 1802. On this trip he was accompanied by Captain Reid of The Briars and Andrew Murison McCrae of Arthurs Seat Station, now known as McCrae Homestead.

1845: Northwest Passage expedition 

The British decided to send a well-equipped Arctic expedition to complete the charting of the Northwest Passage. After Sir James Clark Ross declined an offer to command the expedition, an invitation was extended to Franklin, who despite being 59 years old, accepted what was to become Franklin's lost expedition.

Captain Francis Crozier, who had commanded  during the Ross expedition of 1841–1844 to the Antarctic, was appointed executive officer and commander of Terror.
  The crew was chosen by the Admiralty.  Most of them were Englishmen, many were from northern England, and a small number were Irishmen and Scotsmen.

Erebus and Terror were sturdily built and were outfitted with recent inventions. These included steam engines from the London and Greenwich Railway that enabled the ships to make  on their own power, a unique combined steam-based heating and distillation system for the comfort of the crew and to provide large quantities of fresh water for the engine's boilers, a mechanism that enabled the iron rudder and propeller to be drawn into iron wells to protect them from damage, ships' libraries of more than 1,000 books, and three years' worth of conventionally preserved or tinned preserved food supplies. The tinned preserved food was supplied from a cut-rate provisioner who was awarded the contract a few months before the ships were to sail.

Though the provisioner's "patent process" was sound, the haste with which he had prepared thousands of cans of food led to sloppily-applied beads of solder on the cans' interior edges, allowing lead to leach into the food. Additionally, the water distillation system may have used lead piping and lead-soldered joints, which would have produced drinking water with a high lead content.

The ships travelled north to Aberdeen and the Orkney Isles for supplies. After misjudging the location of Whitefish Bay on Disko Island, the expedition backtracked and finally harboured in that far north outpost to prepare for the rest of their voyage. Five crew members were discharged and sent home on the Rattler and Barretto Junior, reducing the ships' final crew size to 129.

It is now believed that the expedition wintered on Beechey Island in 1845–46. Terror and Erebus became trapped in ice off King William Island in September 1846 and never sailed again.

After two years and no word from the expedition, Lady Franklin urged the Admiralty to send a search party. Because the crew carried supplies for three years, the Admiralty waited another year before launching a search and offering a £20,000 reward for finding the expedition. The money and Franklin's fame led to many searches.

Eventually, more ships and men were lost looking for Franklin than in the expedition itself. Ballads such as "Lady Franklin's Lament", commemorating Lady Franklin's search for her lost husband, became popular.

In the summer of 1850, several expeditions, including three from England as well as one from the United States, joined in the search. They converged off the east coast of Beechey Island, where the first relics of the Franklin expedition were found, including the gravesites of three of Franklin's crewmen. Many presumed Franklin was still alive, and he was promoted to Rear-Admiral of the Blue in October 1852, an example of an unintentional posthumous promotion.

In 1854, the Scottish explorer John Rae, while surveying the Boothia Peninsula for the Hudson's Bay Company, discovered the true fate of the Franklin party from talking to Inuit hunters. He was told both ships had become icebound, and the men had tried to reach safety on foot but had succumbed to cold, and some had resorted to cannibalism.

Rae's report to the Admiralty was leaked to the press, which led to widespread revulsion in Victorian society, enraged Franklin's widow, and condemned Rae to ignominy. Lady Franklin's efforts to eulogise her husband, with support from the British Establishment, led to a further 25 searches over the next four decades, none of which would add much further information of note regarding Franklin and his men, but contributed hugely to the mapping of the Arctic.

In the mid-1980s, Owen Beattie, a University of Alberta professor of anthropology, began a 10-year series of scientific studies that showed that the Beechey Island crew had most likely died of pneumonia and perhaps tuberculosis. Toxicological reports indicated that lead poisoning was also a possible factor.

In 1997, more than 140 years after his report, Dr. Rae's account was finally vindicated; cut marks caused by blades were discovered on the bones of some of the crew found on King William Island, strongly suggested that conditions had become so dire that some crew members resorted to cannibalism. Evidence suggestive of breakage and boiling of bones, characteristic of efforts to extract marrow, was subsequently identified. It appeared from these studies that a combination of bad weather, years locked in ice, poisoned food, botulism, starvation, and disease including scurvy, had killed everyone in the Franklin party. In October 2009, marine archaeologist Robert Grenier outlined recent discoveries of sheet metal and copper which have been recovered from 19th-century Inuit hunting sites. Grenier firmly believes these pieces of metal once belonged to the Terror and formed the protective plating of the ship's hull.

A quote from the British newspaper The Guardian states:

Legacy 

A memorial to Franklin was set up almost immediately on assumption of his death. This is in Westminster Abbey to a design of Matthew Noble.

For years after the loss of the Franklin party, the media of the Victorian era portrayed Franklin as a hero who led his men in the quest for the Northwest Passage. A statue of Franklin in his home town bears the inscription: "Discoverer of the North West Passage". Statues of Franklin outside the Athenaeum Club in London and in Tasmania bear similar inscriptions. There is also a memorial to him in the Chapel of St Michael at Westminster Abbey.

Many geographic locales are named after Franklin, among them Franklin Island in Antarctica, Franklin Island in Greenland, Franklin Strait in northern Canada, Franklin, Quebec, Franklin Sound north of Tasmania, and the Franklin River and town of Franklin in Tasmania, as well as many streets and schools. The Australian oceanographic research vessel  and the Canadian Coast Guard vessel  both bear his name. The wintering site of Franklin's second Canadian expedition, in Délı̨nę, Northwest Territories, was designated a National Historic Site of Canada in 1996. The explorer was also memorialized when one of Canada's Northwest Territories subdivisions was named the District of Franklin.

In 2009, a special service of Thanksgiving was held in the chapel at the Royal Naval College to accompany the rededication of the national monument to Sir John Franklin. It was a celebration of the contributions made by the United Kingdom in the charting of northern Canada, and honoured the loss of life in the pursuit of geographical discovery. The service also marked the 150th anniversary of Francis McClintock's voyage aboard the yacht Fox, and that expedition's return to London with news of the tragedy.

Rediscovery 

The wrecks were found many miles south of their last known location off the northwest coast of King William Island; archaeologists believe the Terror must have been crewed and sailed to its new location, as the anchor was used and it was sailed through a maze of islands and channels. The wrecks are designated as the Wrecks of HMS Erebus and HMS Terror National Historic Site, with the precise locations of the designations in abeyance.

References

Sources

Further reading 

 
 Alexander, Alison (editor) (2005)The Companion to Tasmanian History. Centre for Tasmanian Historical Studies, University of Tasmania, Hobart. .
 Beardsley, Martyn. Deadly Wintre: The Life of Sir John Franklin.
 Beattie, Owen, and Geiger, John (1989). Frozen in Time: Unlocking the Secrets of the Franklin Expedition. Saskatoon: Western Producer Prairie Books. .
 Beattie, Owen and Geiger, John (2004). Frozen In Time: The Fate of the Franklin Expedition (Revised edition).
 Berton, Pierre The Arctic Grail.
 Coleman, E. C. (2006). The Royal Navy in Polar Exploration, Franklin to Scott.
 Cookman, Scott (2001). Ice Blink: The Tragic Fate of Sir John Franklin's Lost Polar Expedition .
 Hutchinson, Gillian (2009). "Searching for Franklin and the Northwest Passage" .
 Davis, Richard C. (1995). "Sir John Franklin's Journals and Correspondence: The First Arctic Land Expedition, 1819–1822". The Champlain Society. .
 Davis, Richard C. (1998). "Sir John Franklin's Journals and Correspondence: The Second Arctic Land Expedition, 1825–1827". The Champlain Society. .
 Joel, C. R. (2011). A Tale of Ambition and Unrealised Hope: John Montagu and Sir John Franklin. .
 Owen Beatle and John Geiger (1992). "Buried in ice: The mystery of a lost arctic expedition" .
 Lambert, Andrew (2009). Franklin: Tragic Hero of Polar Navigation. .
 McGoogan, Ken Fatal Passage and Lady Franklin's Revenge.
 Mirsky, Jeannette (1970). To the Arctic!: The Story of Northern Exploration from Earliest Times. .
 Murray, David. (2004). The Arctic Fox: Francis Leopold McClintock, Discoverer of the fate of Franklin. Cork: The Collins Press, .
 NOVA – Arctic Passage Part 1 – Prisoners of the Ice (TV documentary). See also program transcript
 Payton, Brian (2009). The Ice Passage .
 Potter, Russell A. (2016). Finding Franklin: The Untold Story of a 165-Year Search. Montreal: McGill-Queen's University Press .
 Poulsom, Neville W. & Myres, J. A. L. (2000). British polar exploration and research : a historical and medallic record with biographies, 1818–1999. London: Savannah.
 
 Robson, L.L. (1983) A history of Tasmania. Volume 1. Van Diemen's Land from the earliest times to 1855. Melbourne, Oxford University Press. 
 Sutton, Ann, and Myron Sutton. Journey into Ice; John Franklin and the Northwest Passage,. Chicago: Rand McNally, 1965
 Stefánsson, Vilhjálmur (1938). Unsolved Mysteries of the Arctic.
 Woodman, David C. Unraveling the Franklin Mystery: Inuit Testimony.

External links 

 
 
 
 
 

18th-century English people
19th-century English people
19th-century explorers
1786 births
1840s missing person cases
1847 deaths
Australian penal colony administrators
British polar explorers
Recipients of the Polar Medal
Canadian folklore
English explorers of North America
English folklore
Explorers of Australia
Explorers of Canada
Explorers of the Arctic
Fellows of the Royal Geographical Society
Fellows of the Royal Society
Formerly missing people
Franklin's lost expedition
Governors of Tasmania
Knights Bachelor
Lost explorers
Naval history of Canada
People educated at King Edward VI Grammar School, Louth
People from Spilsby
Persons of National Historic Significance (Canada)
Royal Navy rear admirals
Royal Navy personnel of the Napoleonic Wars
Royal Navy personnel of the War of 1812
Van Diemen's Land people